The Big 12/Pac-10 Hardwood Series was a four-year series of NCAA Division I men's college basketball games matching teams from the Big 12 Conference and the Pac-10 Conference.  Started in 2007 and concluding in 2010, it was primarily a way to guarantee top flight competition for both conferences and garner more recognition for the level of play of both leagues in basketball. This series mirrored the ACC–Big Ten Challenge. There was a "designated" four-day window for the main part of the series matchups and a few other matchups in November and late December.  Because there were more teams in the Big 12 at the time, two teams from the Pac-10 played twice against Big 12 teams. The Pac-10 had a slight advantage on the national stage. UCLA (University of California Los Angeles) has 11 national championships, University of Arizona in 1997 & University of Oregon in 1939. The series originally had a 4-year contract which was not renewed by the conferences in 2010, bringing an end to the series.

Results

2007 
The Pac-10 Conference won the initial installment in 2007 7–5.

Notes: Arizona and Stanford played twice in the series this year.
On November 21, 2007, Texas A&M defeated Washington 77–63 in New York City as part of the NIT Season Tip Off.
On December 2, 2007, Kansas defeated Southern California 59–55 in Los Angeles; the game was not organized as part of the Series.
On December 9, 2007, Kansas State defeated California 82–75 in Manhattan; the game was not organized as part of the Series.
On December 15, 2007, Nebraska defeated Oregon 88–79 in Omaha; the game was not organized as part of the Series.

2008 
In 2008, before the series "officially" tipped off on December 4, the Big 12 was 4–1 versus the Pac-10 in neutral court matchups.

Notes: Arizona and Stanford played twice in the series this year.
On November 23, 2008, Missouri defeated Southern California 83–72 in San Juan, Puerto Rico as part of the O'Reilly Auto Parts Puerto Rico Tip Off.
On November 24, 2008, Kansas defeated Washington 73–54 in Kansas City as part of the College Basketball Experience Classic.
On November 26, 2008, Texas defeated Oregon 70–57 in Maui as part of the EA Sports Maui Invitational.
On November 29, 2008, Baylor defeated Arizona State 87–78 in Anaheim as part of the 76 Classic.
On December 13, 2008, Oregon State defeated Nebraska 64–63 in Corvallis; the game was not organized as part of the Series.

2009

Notes: Southern California and Washington played twice in the series this year. 
 On November 15, 2009, Texas Tech defeated Oregon State 64–60 in Lubbock; the game was not organized as part of the Series.
On November 24, 2009, Arizona defeated Colorado 91–87 in Maui as part of the EA Sports Maui Invitational.
 On December 12, 2009, Nebraska defeated Oregon State 50–44 in Lincoln; the game was not organized as part of the Series.
On December 22, 2009, Kansas defeated California 84–69 in Lawrence; the game was not organized as part of the Series.

2010

Notes: Southern California and Washington played twice in the Series this year.

On November 27, 2010, Kansas defeated Arizona 87–79 in Las Vegas as part of the Las Vegas Invitational.
On December 18, 2010, Kansas defeated Southern California 70–68 in Lawrence; the game was not organized as part of the Series.
On December 22, 2010, Kansas defeated California 78–63 in Berkeley; this game is not organized as part of the Series.

Team records

Big 12 Conference (2–1–1)

Pac-10 Conference (1–2–1)

References

External links
Big 12 Conference Official Website
Pac-10 Conference Official Website

College men's basketball competitions in the United States
Big 12 Conference men's basketball
Pac-12 Conference men's basketball
Recurring sporting events established in 2007
Recurring sporting events disestablished in 2010